John Michael Crook (born 11 June 1940) was Bishop of Moray, Ross and Caithness from 1999 to 2006.

Biography 
Crook was born on 11 June 1940 and educated at Dame Allan's School, Newcastle, William Hulme's Grammar School, Manchester, St David’s College, Lampeter and the College of the Resurrection, Mirfield. He was ordained in 1965. After curacies in Horninglow and Bloxwich he held incumbencies in Inverness (St Michael & All Angels), Callander, and Bridge of Allan. He was a canon residentiary at St Ninian's Cathedral, Perth until his elevation to the episcopate.

Notes

1940 births
People educated at William Hulme's Grammar School
Alumni of the University of Wales, Lampeter
Alumni of the College of the Resurrection
20th-century Scottish Episcopalian bishops
21st-century Scottish Episcopalian bishops
Bishops of Moray, Ross and Caithness
Living people
People educated at Dame Allan's School